Carmen Álvarez Sánchez (born 24 February 2003) is a Spanish footballer who plays as a forward for Real Betis.

Club career
Álvarez started her career at Salamanca FF.

References

External links
Profile at La Liga

2003 births
Living people
Women's association football forwards
Spanish women's footballers
Sportspeople from Salamanca
Footballers from Castile and León
Atlético Madrid Femenino players
Primera División (women) players
Segunda Federación (women) players
21st-century Spanish women
SD Eibar Femenino players
Real Betis Féminas players